Surré is a village in the commune of Boulaide, in north-western Luxembourg.  , the village has a population of 180.

Boulaide
Villages in Luxembourg